Sekher may refer to:
 Sekher-e Olya
 Sekher-e Sofla